Jae-yong is a Korean masculine given name. Its meaning differs based on the hanja used to write each syllable of the name. There are 20 hanja with the reading "jae" and 24 hanja with the reading "yong" on the South Korean government's official list of hanja which may be registered for use in given names.

People with this name include:
 Yoo Jae-yong (born 1936), South Korean novelist
 Kwak Jae-yong (born 1959), South Korean director and screenwriter
 Lee Jae-yong (actor) (born 1963), South Korean actor
 E J-yong (born 1966), South Korean film director
 Lee Jae-yong (businessman) (born 1968), South Korean businessman, son of Samsung chairman Lee Kun-hee
 Park Jae-yong (footballer) (born 1985), South Korean footballer
 Cho Jae-yong (born 1984), South Korean footballer
 Kim Jae-yong (born 1994), South Korean singer and actor, former member of boy group HALO

See also
List of Korean given names

References

Korean masculine given names